Angecourt is a commune in the Ardennes department in the Grand Est region of northern France.

The inhabitants of the commune are known as Dadas

The commune has been awarded one flower by the National Council of Towns and Villages in Bloom in the Competition of cities and villages in Bloom.

Geography
Angecourt is located some 8 km south-east of Sedan and 7 km north-west of Mouzon. Access to the commune is by road D6 from Remilly-Aillicourt in the north-east which passes through the commune and the village and continues to Haraucourt in the south-west. About half of the commune in the south and east is forested with the rest farmland.

The Ennemane flows through the commune from south-west to north-east to join the Coupure de Remilly at Remilly-Aillicourt.

Neighbouring communes and villages

History
From 1560 to 1642 Angecourt was part of the Principality of Sedan.
Battle of Sedan (1940)

Heraldry

Administration

List of Successive Mayors

Population

Culture and heritage

Civil heritage
A Spinning Mill at 15 Rue du Chateau (19th century) is registered as an historical monument.

Religious heritage
The Church of Saint Médard contains a Funeral Plaque of Nicolas des Oudet (18th century) which is registered as an historical object.

See also
Communes of the Ardennes department

References

External links
 Angecourt on the old IGN website 
Angecourt on the 1750 Cassini Map

Communes of Ardennes (department)